Francis Zama (born 3 July 1956) is a Solomon Islands politician. He is a member of the National Parliament of the Solomon Islands, and was elected to Parliament representing Tetepare on Rendova Island, South New Georgia on 5 December 2001 and was re-elected on 5 April 2006. He was Minister of Finance of the Solomon Islands from 2003 to 2005 and in 2007.

References

Finance Ministers of the Solomon Islands
Members of the National Parliament of the Solomon Islands
1956 births
Living people
People from the Western Province (Solomon Islands)